Sing is the second official studio album released by recording artist Jim Bianco and the first album to be released on the Hotel Cafe Records label. Bianco has said that most of the songs on this album were composed on the piano at the Hotel Café after regular club hours. In 2008, "I Got A Thing For You (Remix)" was featured in the national television ad campaign for "Chickdowntown.com" and "To Hell With the Devil" was featured during an episode of Moonlight on CBS. Also in 2008, Bianco performed "I Got A Thing For You" on The Late Late Show with Craig Ferguson, which aired in October. In 2010, four songs from this album were featured in the film Ca$h. In 2012, "I Got A Thing For You" was featured in an episode of NBC's series The Firm.

Track listing
All songs were written by Jim Bianco.
“I Got A Thing For You”–3:32
 “Sing”–3:36
 “Somebody’s Gonna Get Hurt”–3:41
 “Painkiller”–3:16
 “Never Again”–2:40
 “If Your Mama Knew”–3:38
 “Wrecking Ball”–3:02
 “Belong”–3:11
 “Get On”–3:45
 “To Hell With The Devil”–2:34
 “I Got A Thing For You” (Remix)–3:39

Personnel
Jim Bianco–vocals, guitar, piano on 2, 3, 4, 8, electric piano on 9 and 11
Brad Gordon–guitar, piano, electric piano, clarinet, accordion, percussion, background vocals, organ
Josef Zimmerman–contrabass
Kenny Lyon–electric guitar on 1, 3, 5, and 7
Matt DeMerritt–saxophone, electric pianco on 7
Jason Pipkin–percussion
Gary Jules–guest background vocals on 2 and 6
Cary Brothers–guest background vocals on 2 and 6
David Ralicke– trombone,  background vocals

Additional production information
Produced by Brad Gordon and Jim Bianco
Mixed by Brad Gordon
Engineered by Brad Gordon and Sheldon Gomberg
Mastered by Evren Goknar at Capitol Mastering
All photography shot by Bethany Dwyer at Fonogenic Studios
Art direction by Jim Bianco
Art production by Tammy Bumann

Studio information
This record was recorded at Magic Carpet Studios and The Carriage House. 
Basic tracks to “Get On” recorded at The Schtude with Will Golden.

Videos
Bianco produced and released three videos in association with songs on this album.

I Got a Thing For You
Painkiller: Live from my kitchen
Sing: A Virtual Tour Through the Album

External links
Official website
Jim Bianco on MySpace
Jim Bianco on Facebook
Jim Bianco on Twitter
Jim Bianco's Youtube Channel

Jim Bianco albums
2008 albums